In Italy, municipal police (Italian: polizia municipale) or Polizia Municipale, Polizia Locale are police of the various municipalities of Italy.

They are, in effect, the local police and work alongside the Ministry of Interior's Polizia di Stato and Polizia Penitenziaria , the Ministry of Defence's Carabinieri, the Ministry of Finance's Guardia di Finanza and other emergency services.

Overview

Some municipal police forces in Italy trace historical origins to the vigili urbani and comes stabili of ancient Rome.

Urban policing emerged in the 13th to 14th centuries in the Italian comunes (such as Bologna); although police forces have been assumed to be a modern innovation, these medieval forces had some similarities to modern police forces. Today, Italian municipal forces go by various names, such as polizia comunale (comune police), polizia urbana (urban police), and polizia locale (local police).

Function

These are bodies that are established by Italian local authorities and the central functions of municipal police are administrative in character, including traffic control and responsibilities relating to licenses and urban regulations.

The municipal police also serve as auxiliaries to security police forces and have responsibilities for local crime prevention and community policing. The competence (jurisdiction) of municipal police are limited to their specific municipality.

Prior to the 1990s, municipal policing in Italy has a marginal role and was viewed as low-level in comparison to the Carabinieri, Polizia di Stato, and other police forces; since that time, the strength and reputation of the municipal policy has been enhanced, particularly in central and northern Italy.

Numbers

There are roughly 60,000 municipal police officers in Italy; since 2011, the Italian regions have been exclusively responsible for coordinating, organizing, and training municipal police.

Equipment

Like most Italian police forces, the Polizia Municipale use a variety of police equipment for the execution of their duties. These include:

motor vehicles - typically Fiats, Renault or Alfa Romeo
firearms and personal defence equipment - more recently local police are being armed, like the state police forces
uniform - this varies between each municipality, but often features white belts and white-topped caps
other equipment - such as the paletta (white 'lollipop' stick to direct traffic)

Each commune has slightly different uniforms and equipment, unlike the state's police forces, as each Polizia Municipale is controlled locally, not by central government.

Vehicles

Most local police vehicles  are white marked with green, blue, or red stripes with logos. Some forces use blue vehicles almost always with white stripes.

The following types are used:

Fiat
Alfa Romeo
Opel

Firearms and Equipment
As is customary with most European and Italian police forces, most agentes are now armed with a personal protection weapon - a pistol. This has not always been the case, but is becoming more common practice.
This is generally worn in a pistol holster on a belt, or slung from a tunic pocket flap, often on the left-hand side in Italian fashion, to allow for cross-draw of the weapon.

Local police officers and officers in possession of the status of " public security officer ", issued by the prefect at the request of the mayor, can carry without a license the firearm assigned personally for self- defense.

The choice regarding the arming of the police force is up to the individual municipal councils, which regulates the quantity, the model and the occasions in which the armed service is provided. It is allowed to equip the local police corps with short weapons such as semi-automatic pistols or revolvers for personal defence reasons, while the provision of long guns is allowed only for rural and hunting police services.

The local police regulations approved by the city council may also provide for the provision of defensive tactical tools and aids that cannot be classified as weapons, such as the OC anti-aggression spray and extendable batons.

These devices must comply with certain low-harmfulness requirements established by law and the specific municipal regulation must be sent to the prefect.

The individual municipal regulations also establish the types of services to be provided in arms (usually no arming is provided for representation services or on the occasion of particular ceremonies).

The decree law 4 October 2018, n. 113 - converted into law 1 December 2018, n. 132 - Italian municipalities - with more than 90,000 inhabitants - were given the right to equip agents with tasers on an experimental basis.

Some sub-machine guns/machine-pistols are also issued, but this is less common.

Local Police weapons include:
Beretta 92
Glock 17
Brügger & Thomet APC9

Batons are also carried, along with handcuffs, but the most noticeable piece of equipment is probably the paletta, a red and white stop sign used to stop and direct traffic.

Radios are used, as well as whistles, notebooks and pens.

Uniforms

Uniforms vary greatly between each Polizia Locale, but the common features include:

White helmet (similar to the British custodian helmet) - used for traffic duties and ceremonies.
White-topped, yellow-topped or blue-topped peaked cap (for males) or bowler cap (for females) 
Blue beret
Blue baseball cap

White or Dark Blue Tunics
Blue or White Shirts
NATO jumpers
Polo-shirts
Jackets
Trousers
Coats
Black boots/shoes
High-visibility vest

White/black gloves
White waist or Sam Browne belt
Black belt

See also
Law enforcement in Italy
Carabinieri
Polizia di Stato
Guardia di Finanza
Polizia Penitenziaria
Polizia Provinciale

Notes

External links

Law enforcement agencies of Italy
Municipal law enforcement agencies

sk:Obecná polícia